Baodiao movement (literally Defend the Diaoyu Islands movement) is a social movement originating among Republic of China students in the United States in the 1970s, and more recently expressed in Mainland China, Hong Kong and Taiwan that asserts Chinese sovereignty over the Diaoyu/Senkaku Islands. The territorial right to the islands is disputed among the People's Republic of China, the Republic of China, and Japan. Action Committee for Defending the Diaoyu Islands and China Federation for Defending the Diaoyu Islands are the main representative organizations in the movement.

Political context 
The Diaoyu/Senkaku Island are located northeast of Taiwan and southwest of Okinawa in the East China Sea. Administratively, they depend on the city of Ishigaki, on the island of the same name, in Okinawa Prefecture. Geographically, they are a part of the Sakishima Islands archipelago - along with the Yaeyama Islands and Miyako Islands (further to the south) - and the larger Ryukyu Islands.

The islands have been claimed since the late 1960s by the Republic of China, which views them as part of the city of Toucheng in Yilan County, as well as by the People's Republic of China, which claims them as part of Taiwan province. Protests occurred in the early 1970s, particularly among ROC students in the United States, where protests were not as tightly controlled as in Taiwan. Though put on hold between 1978 and 1996 following the signing of a Chinese-Japanese diplomatic accord, the conflict was re-ignited when the "Nihon Seinensha" (Federation of Japanese Youth), a movement attached to the major Yakuza group Sumiyoshi-kai, built a lighthouse on the northernmost Senkaku island.

Events 
 In 1972, the United States ended occupation of Okinawa and Diaoyu Islands, initiating Senkaku Islands dispute.
 In 2004, Chinese activists from the Baodiao movement landed on the islands and were arrested. Two days letter, Japanese prime minister Junichirō Koizumi demanded their return to China.
 In October 2007, Japan denounced the attempted landing of Chinese nationalist militants from the movement.
 On June 10, 2008, a Taiwanese fishing vessel and a boat from the Japan Coast Guard collided. The Taiwan Foreign Ministry recalled its representative in Tokyo to Taipei, and demanded apologies and compensation from Japan. A few days later, a nationalist boat escorted by nine Taiwanese military patrol boats came near Uotsuri-jima as a protest, before returning to Taiwan; Japan then called for both countries to "act calmly".
On September 25, 2012, 81 Taiwanese trawlers accompanied by a dozen Taiwan Coast Guard patrol boats patrolled off the Senkaku/Diaoyu Islands to defend the sovereignty of the Republic of China on the islands and Taiwan's fishing rights in the area. The banners of the Baodiao movement were deployed on the trawlers. A clash occurred with the Japanese coast guard, who used water cannons on the Taiwanese vessels.

Leadership 
One of the prominent leaders of the Movement was David Chan Yuk-cheung. He drowned in the sea near the disputed islands during the first wave of direct protests. Tens of thousands of people from Hong Kong mourned his death in Victoria Park on Hong Kong Island.

See also

2012 China anti-Japanese demonstrations
Anti-Japanese sentiment in China

References

China–Japan relations
Japan–Taiwan relations
Senkaku Islands
Political movements in Taiwan